Carlos Antonio Castro Caputo (born 17 December 1974) is a Spanish former footballer who played as a right back, and is the current assistant manager of Sporting de Gijón.

Club career
Castro was born in Seville, Andalusia. Grown in the youth ranks of Sevilla FC, he never appeared officially for their first team, going on to resume his career almost exclusively in Segunda División B, mainly with Hércules CF. During his spell in the Valencian Community he was eventually awarded team captaincy, also being one of the most capped players in the club's history.

After having appeared in 32 matches – 31 starts – in the 2005–06 season to help Hércules retain its Segunda División status, Castro left the Estadio José Rico Pérez after a run-in with manager José Bordalás. He continued playing in the region until his retirement in November 2008 with Villajoyosa CF (third division) and FC Jove Español (amateurs), calling it quits after not being able to recover from an injury.

Castro served as assistant coach at Alicante CF in 2008–09, as the second-tier campaign ended in relegation and saw the side hire no fewer than four managers. He continued working with the organisation in directorial capacities, switching to Real Murcia in 2010 and returning to Hércules the following year.

Subsequently, Castro was part of David Gallego's staff at RCD Espanyol and Sporting de Gijón.

International career
Castro represented Spain at the 1991 FIFA U-17 World Championship in Italy, playing all the games for the eventual runners-up.

Honours

Club
Ceuta
Tercera División: 1995–96, 1996–97

International
Spain U16
UEFA European Under-16 Championship: 1991

Spain U17
FIFA U-17 World Cup runner-up: 1991

References

External links

1974 births
Living people
Spanish footballers
Footballers from Seville
Association football defenders
Segunda División players
Segunda División B players
Tercera División players
Sevilla Atlético players
AD Ceuta footballers
Universidad de Las Palmas CF footballers
Hércules CF players
Villajoyosa CF footballers
Spain youth international footballers